Diana Mary Warwick, Baroness Warwick of Undercliffe (born 16 July 1945) is a Labour member of the House of Lords.

Background
Warwick was educated at Bedford College, University of London, BSc Sociology, 1967, now part of Royal Holloway, University of London.

Career
She is former Chair of the Human Tissue Authority. She is also Chair of International Students House, London.

She was Chief Executive of Universities UK for 14 years.

Previously she was General Secretary of the Association of University Teachers from 1983 to 1992 and Chief Executive of the Westminster Foundation for Democracy from 1992 to 1995 and also Chair of Voluntary Service Overseas (VSO).

On 10 July 1999 she was created a life peer as Baroness Warwick of Undercliffe, of Undercliffe in the County of West Yorkshire.

Her husband was Sean Terence Bowes Young (1943-2021), son of the director Terence Young and writer Dorothea Bennett.

References

Alumni of Bedford College, London
Alumni of Royal Holloway, University of London
Warwick of Undercliffe, Diana Warwick, Baroness
Warwick of Undercliffe, Diana Warwick, Baroness
British trade unionists
Life peeresses created by Elizabeth II
Warwick of Undercliffe, Diana Warwick, Baroness
Members of the General Council of the Trades Union Congress